Ljiljana Crepajac (Serbian Cyrillic: Љиљана Црепајац) (born 1931, died 2018) was a Serbian classical scholar, philologist, and a full-time professor at the University of Belgrade Faculty of Philosophy on the subject Historical grammar of Old Greek; she was the head of the Department of Classical Sciences (since 1994), and she has been a full professor since 1987.

Crepajac graduated from the Faculty of Philosophy, University of Belgrade, where she received a PhD; she obtained her MA degree at the University of Copenhagen. She was fluent in English, German, Russian, Italian and French, as well as in Latin and Old Greek.

Selected works 

 Doctoral thesis: On the Prefix a in Classical Languages (1973),
 A textbook: Stoiheia Hellenika - the Elements of Greek Glotollogy (1967);
 Papers from Hellenic Glotology;
 Primary Synesthesis in Indoeuropean,
 Indoeuropaische Gutturale im Greichischen und mykenische Zeugnisse;
 Zur Etymologie von griech sidaros und /s/ mudros;
 Pelastian Proto-Slavonic Reletions According to the Researches of Milan Budimir

Translations 

From Ancient Greek:

 Aristotle's Politics;
 Sophocles' Oedipus Rex;
 Aristophanes' Ecclesiazusae;
  
From Latin:

 Tacitus' Annals

References

1931 births
2018 deaths
Serbian classical scholars
Serbian scientists
University of Belgrade Faculty of Philology alumni
Academic staff of the University of Belgrade
Serbian women scientists
Yugoslav scientists